Sebastian Sageder (born 25 January 1980) is an Austrian lightweight rower. He won a gold medal at the 2001 World Rowing Championships in Lucerne with the lightweight men's four.

References

1980 births
Living people
Austrian male rowers
World Rowing Championships medalists for Austria
Olympic rowers of Austria
Rowers at the 2004 Summer Olympics